James is a 2005 Indian Hindi action film starring Mohit Ahlawat and Nisha Kothari. It was directed by Rohit Jugraj.

Plot
James, who comes to Mumbai seeking a successful life, ends up working as a bouncer at a club there, and fighting gangsters. He then encounters the brother of an MP who is always causing crime. James has a little fight in club which cause causes a huge conflict between the two, this also gets his brother and MP Shanthi Narayana involved. This conflict then causes death of James's friend, whom he lives with, Babloo, and because of this James is set on revenge.

Cast
Mohit Ahlawat as James
Priyanka Kothari as Nisha V. Rawat
Mohan Agashe as DCP Vijay Singh Rawat
Zakir Hussain as Shanti Narayan
Shereveer Vakil as Radhey Narayan
Ravi Kale as Inspector Talwekar
Snehal Dabi as Babloo
Rajpal Yadav as Tony
Vinayakan as Shanti Narayan's henchman
Vineet Sharma as Shanti Narayan's henchman
Riya Sen as item number

Music
Jan Hain Tujhpe Jan Hain - Shreya Ghoshal, Sonu Nigam
Jindagee Jine Kaa Nam Hain Jee Le - Shweta Pandit
Sinduree Aasman Hain Sharmaya Sa - Shweta Pandit, Sonu Nigam
Suraj Kee Kirno Kee Lalee Me Tum Ho - Shweta Pandit, Sonu Nigam
Woh Hero Hain, Hero Hain Woh Hain Hero - Sunidhi Chauhan

Critical reception 
The Birmingham Evening Mail wrote, "The fight scenes and the songs are entertaining", but overall the film is "instantly forgettable".
James was a major disappointment for its producers.

References

External links 
 

2005 films
2000s Hindi-language films
Films directed by Rohit Jugraj Chauhan
Films scored by Nitin Raikwar
Films scored by Amar Mohile